This is a list of diplomatic missions of Armenia. Armenia is a landlocked country located in the Southern Caucasus. Over 8 million Armenians reside abroad, with large communities located in Russia, France, Iran, United States, Georgia, Lebanon, Argentina, and Ukraine. The Ministry of Foreign Affairs oversees Armenia's diplomatic missions abroad.

Honorary consuls are excluded from this listing.

Current missions

Africa

Americas

Asia

Europe

Multilateral organizations

Gallery

Closed missions

Europe

Future missions to open
Below is a list of countries where the government of Armenia has stated its intentions to open a diplomatic mission:

 Canberra (Embassy)

 Tabriz (Consulate-General)

 Montevideo (Embassy)

See also
 Foreign relations of Armenia
 List of diplomatic missions in Armenia
 List of current ambassadors from Armenia
 List of representative offices of Artsakh

Notes

References

External links
 Ministry of Foreign Affairs of Armenia
 Embassies of Armenia
 Consulates of Armenia

 
Armenia
Diplomatic missions